Rakesh Pradhan (born 2 August 1993), is an Indian professional footballer who plays as a defender for I-League 2nd Division club Bengaluru United.

Career
Born in Assam, Pradhan is a product of the Shillong Lajong academy. While still a regular with the academy set-up, Pradhan made his first appearances for the Shillong Lajong first team during the 2013–14 I-League. Pradhan appeared on the bench on three occasions, against Dempo, Pune, and East Bengal, but didn't see any time on the pitch.

More than four years later, prior to the 2017–18 season, Pradhan was added to the Shillong Lajong first team for the I-League. He then made his professional debut for the club in their opening match against Gokulam Kerala. Pradhan started and played the whole match as Shillong Lajong won 1–0. At the end of the season, Pradhan had played and started in all 18 of Shillong Lajong's matches during the I-League season.

On 4 April 2018, Pradhan scored his first professional goal against Pune City in the Super Cup. His goal in the 61st minute was the equalizer as Shillong Lajong came back from being 0–2 down to winning 3–2.

On 18 January 2021, Pradhan was signed by Odisha FC on loan from NorthEast United & made his debut for the new club on 19 January against Hyderabad FC.

Career statistics

References

External links 
 Shillong Lajong Profile

1997 births
Living people
People from Assam
Indian footballers
Shillong Lajong FC players
Association football defenders
Footballers from Assam
I-League players
Indian Super League players
NorthEast United FC players
Odisha FC players
Sudeva Delhi FC players